For the Benefit of All ( / Да свако има) was an opposition catch-all and pro-EU political alliance in Montenegro. It is composed of the Socialist People's Party (SNP), United Montenegro (UCG) and Workers' Party (RP), as well as some independents. The main goal of the alliance was to overthrow the ruling Democratic Party of Socialists of Montenegro (DPS) of President Milo Đukanović, which has been in power since its founding in 1991.

History
The alliance was formed on 1 May 2019 in Bijelo Polje, by signing an agreement between Socialist People's Party (SNP) of Vladimir Joković with Independent parliamentary group composed of United Montenegro (UCG), Workers' Party (RP, former Democratic Front member) and two independent MPs, Aleksandar Damjanović and Anka Vukićević, both elected from 2016 Key Coalition electoral list. Damjanović rejoined the Socialist People's Party in early 2020.

Alliance composition

Dissolution

Alliance eventually dissolved prior the parliamentary election in August 2020, all three parties decided to join a pre-election coalition with populist Democratic Front (DF) alliance, employing and more significant cultural and socially conservative discourse, supporting 2019-2020 clerical protests in Montenegro and Serbian Orthodox Church rights in Montenegro.

References

Political parties established in 2019
Defunct political party alliances in Montenegro